Robert Brian "Robin" Cook (born May 4, 1940) is an American physician and novelist who writes about medicine and topics affecting public health.

He is best known for combining medical writing with the thriller genre. Many of his books have been bestsellers on The New York Times Best Seller List. Several of his books have also been featured in Reader's Digest. His books have sold nearly 400 million copies worldwide.

Early life and career
Cook was born in Brooklyn, New York City, and grew up in Woodside, Queens. He moved to Leonia, New Jersey when he was eight, where he could first have the "luxury" of having his own room.  He graduated from Wesleyan University and Columbia University College of Physicians and Surgeons, and finished his postgraduate medical training at Harvard.

Cook ran the Cousteau Society's blood-gas lab in the south of France. He later became an aquanaut (a submarine doc) with the U.S. Navy's SEALAB program when he was drafted in 1969. Cook served in the Navy from 1969 to 1971, reaching the rank of lieutenant commander. He wrote his first novel, Year of the Intern, while serving on the Polaris submarine .

Novelist
The Year of the Intern was a failure, but Cook began to study bestsellers. He said, "I studied how the reader was manipulated by the writer. I came up with a list of techniques that I wrote down on index cards. And I used every one of them in Coma." He conceived the idea for Coma, about illegally creating a supply of transplant organs, in 1975. In  March 1977, that novel's paperback rights sold for $800,000. It was followed by the Egyptology thriller Sphinx in 1979 and another medical thriller, Brain, in 1981. Cook then decided he preferred writing over a career in medicine.

Cook's novels combine medical fact with fantasy. His medical thrillers are designed, in part, to keep the public aware of both the technological possibilities of modern medicine and the ensuing socio-ethical problems which come along with it. Cook says he chose to write thrillers because the forum gives him "an opportunity to get the public interested in things about medicine that they didn't seem to know about. I believe my books are actually teaching people."

The author admits he never thought that he would have such compelling material to work with when he began writing fiction in 1970. "If I tried to be the writer I am today a number of years ago, I wouldn't have very much to write about. But today, with the pace of change in biomedical research, there are any number of different issues, and new ones to come," he says.

Cook's novels have anticipated national controversy. In an interview with Stephen McDonald about the novel Shock, Cook admitted the book's timing was fortuitous:

To date, Cook has explored issues such as organ donation, fertility treatment, genetic engineering, in vitro fertilization, research funding, managed care, medical malpractice, medical tourism, drug research, and organ transplantation.

Many of his novels revolve around hospitals (both fictional and non-fictional) in Boston, which may have to do with the fact that he underwent his post-graduate training at Harvard and has a residence in Boston, or in New York.

Personal life
He is on leave from the Massachusetts Eye and Ear Infirmary.

Cook is a private member of the Woodrow Wilson Center's Board of Trustees. The Board of Trustees, led by chairman Joseph B. Gildenhorn, are appointed to six-year terms by the President of the United States.

Books 
 Year of the Intern (1972), 
 Coma (1977), 
 Sphinx (1979), 
 Brain (1980), 
 Fever (1982), 
 Godplayer (1983), 
 Mindbend (1985), 
 Outbreak (1987), 
 Mortal Fear (1988), 
 Mutation (1989), 
 Harmful Intent (1990), 
 Vital Signs (1991), 
 Terminal (1993), 
 Fatal Cure (1993), 
 Acceptable Risk (1995), 
 Invasion (1997), 
 Toxin (1998), 
 Abduction (2000), 
 Shock (2001), 
 Seizure (2003), 
 Death Benefit (2011), 
 Nano (2013), 
 Cell (2014), 
 Host (2015), 
 Charlatans (2017), 
 Viral (2021), ISBN 9780593328293

 Jack Stapleton and Laurie Montgomery series
 Blindsight (1992), 
 Contagion (1995), 
 Chromosome 6 (1997), 
 Vector (1999), 
 Marker (2005), 
 Crisis (2006), 
 Critical (2007), 
 Foreign Body (2008), 
 Intervention (2009), 
 Cure (2010), 
 [[Pandemic (2018 novel)|Pandemic (2018)]], 
 Genesis (2019), 
 Night Shift (2022),

Film and television adaptations
 Coma (1977) has been adapted for both film and television:
 Coma (1978), a feature film directed by author/doctor Michael Crichton and produced by Martin Erlichmann for Metro-Goldwyn-Mayer
 Coma (airdates September 3–4, 2012) a four-hour A&E television mini-series based on the 1977 novel and subsequent 1978 film, directed by Mikael Salomon and produced by brothers Ridley and Tony Scott
 Sphinx (1979) was adapted into the feature film Sphinx (1981), directed by Franklin J. Schaffner, produced by Orion Pictures for Warner Bros., and starring Lesley-Anne Down and Frank Langella
 Harmful Intent (1990) was adapted as the CBS television movie Robin Cook's Harmful Intent (airdate January 1, 1993), directed by John Patterson and produced by David A. Rosemont
 Mortal Fear (1988) was as an eponymous TV movie, airdate November 20, 1994, directed by Larry Shaw
 Outbreak (1987) was adapted as the film Virus (Formula For Death) (airdate May 1995), directed by Armand Mastroianni
 Terminal (1993) was adapted as TV movie, directed by Larry Elikann
 Invasion (1997) was adapted as an eponymous NBC TV mini-series (airdate May 4, 1997), directed by Armand Mastroianni.
 Acceptable Risk (2001)
 Foreign Body (2008) spawned a 2008 prequel, produced as an eponymous web series by the production companies Vuguru (owned by former Walt Disney CEO Michael Eisner), Cyber Group Studios (owned by the former Walt Disney executives Dominique Bourse and Pierre Sissmann), and Big Fantastic (owned by the creators of the web television series SamHas7Friends and Prom Queen).  The series, which ran from May 27 through August 4, 2008, comprised 50 episodes of approximately two minutes each, with a new video posted every weekday.

References

External links

Robin Cook on The Internet Book List
Robin Cook on Fantastic Fiction UK

1940 births
Living people
20th-century American novelists
21st-century American novelists
American male novelists
American medical writers
Aquanauts
Columbia University Vagelos College of Physicians and Surgeons alumni
Harvard University alumni
Medical fiction writers
People from Leonia, New Jersey
People from Queens, New York
United States Navy Medical Corps officers
Wesleyan University alumni
20th-century American male writers
21st-century American male writers
Novelists from New York (state)
20th-century American non-fiction writers
21st-century American non-fiction writers
American male non-fiction writers
Military personnel from New Jersey